This is a list of electoral division results for the Australian 1974 federal election.

Overall
This section is an excerpt from 1974 Australian federal election § House of Representatives results

New South Wales

Banks 
This section is an excerpt from Electoral results for the Division of Banks § 1974

Barton 
This section is an excerpt from Electoral results for the Division of Barton § 1974

Bennelong 
This section is an excerpt from Electoral results for the Division of Bennelong § 1974

Berowra 
This section is an excerpt from Electoral results for the Division of Berowra § 1974

Blaxland 
This section is an excerpt from Electoral results for the Division of Blaxland § 1974

Bradfield 
This section is an excerpt from Electoral results for the Division of Bradfield § 1974

Calare 
This section is an excerpt from Electoral results for the Division of Calare § 1974

Chifley 
This section is an excerpt from Electoral results for the Division of Chifley § 1974

Cook 
This section is an excerpt from Electoral results for the Division of Cook § 1974

Cowper 
This section is an excerpt from Electoral results for the Division of Cowper § 1974

Cunningham 
This section is an excerpt from Electoral results for the Division of Cunningham § 1974

Darling 
This section is an excerpt from Electoral results for the Division of Darling § 1974

Eden-Monaro 
This section is an excerpt from Electoral results for the Division of Eden-Monaro § 1974

Evans 
This section is an excerpt from Electoral results for the Division of Evans § 1974

Farrer 
This section is an excerpt from Electoral results for the Division of Farrer § 1974

Grayndler 
This section is an excerpt from Electoral results for the Division of Grayndler § 1974

Gwydir 
This section is an excerpt from Electoral results for the Division of Gwydir § 1974

Hughes 
This section is an excerpt from Electoral results for the Division of Hughes § 1974

Hume 
This section is an excerpt from Electoral results for the Division of Hume § 1974

Hunter 
This section is an excerpt from Electoral results for the Division of Hunter § 1974

Kingsford Smith 
This section is an excerpt from Electoral results for the Division of Kingsford Smith § 1974

Lang 
This section is an excerpt from Electoral results for the Division of Lang § 1974

Lowe 
This section is an excerpt from Electoral results for the Division of Lowe § 1974

Lyne 
This section is an excerpt from Electoral results for the Division of Lyne § 1974

Macarthur 
This section is an excerpt from Electoral results for the Division of Macarthur § 1974

Mackellar 
This section is an excerpt from Electoral results for the Division of Mackellar § 1974

Macquarie 
This section is an excerpt from Electoral results for the Division of Macquarie § 1974

Mitchell 
This section is an excerpt from Electoral results for the Division of Mitchell § 1974

New England 
This section is an excerpt from Electoral results for the Division of New England § 1974

Newcastle 
This section is an excerpt from Electoral results for the Division of Newcastle1974

North Sydney 
This section is an excerpt from Electoral results for the Division of North Sydney § 1974

Parramatta 
This section is an excerpt from Electoral results for the Division of Parramatta § 1974

Paterson 
This section is an excerpt from Electoral results for the Division of Paterson § 1974

Phillip 
This section is an excerpt from Electoral results for the Division of Phillip § 1974

Prospect 
This section is an excerpt from Electoral results for the Division of Prospect § 1974

Reid
This section is an excerpt from Electoral results for the Division of Reid § 1974

Richmond 
This section is an excerpt from Electoral results for the Division of Richmond § 1974

Riverina 
This section is an excerpt from Electoral results for the Division of Riverina § 1974

Robertson 
This section is an excerpt from Electoral results for the Division of Robertson § 1974

Shortland 
This section is an excerpt from Electoral results for the Division of Shortland § 1974

St George 
This section is an excerpt from Electoral results for the Division of St George § 1974

Sydney 
This section is an excerpt from Electoral results for the Division of Sydney § 1974

Warringah 
This section is an excerpt from Electoral results for the Division of Warringah § 1974

Wentworth 
This section is an excerpt from Electoral results for the Division of Wentworth § 1974

Werriwa 
This section is an excerpt from Electoral results for the Division of Werriwa § 1974

Victoria

Balaclava 
This section is an excerpt from Electoral results for the Division of Balaclava § 1974

Ballaarat 
This section is an excerpt from Electoral results for the Division of Ballarat § 1974

Batman 
This section is an excerpt from Electoral results for the Division of Batman § 1974

Bendigo 
This section is an excerpt from Electoral results for the Division of Bendigo § 1974

Bruce 
This section is an excerpt from Electoral results for the Division of Bruce § 1974

Burke 
This section is an excerpt from Electoral results for the Division of Burke (1969–2004) § 1974

Casey 
This section is an excerpt from Electoral results for the Division of Casey § 1974

Chisholm 
This section is an excerpt from Electoral results for the Division of Chisholm § 1974

Corangamite 
This section is an excerpt from Electoral results for the Division of Corangamite § 1974

Corio 
This section is an excerpt from Electoral results for the Division of Corio § 1974

Deakin 
This section is an excerpt from Electoral results for the Division of Deakin § 1974

Diamond Valley 
This section is an excerpt from Electoral results for the Division of Diamond Valley § 1974

Flinders 
This section is an excerpt from Electoral results for the Division of Flinders § 1974

Gellibrand 
This section is an excerpt from Electoral results for the Division of Gellibrand § 1974

Gippsland 
This section is an excerpt from Electoral results for the Division of Gippsland § 1974

Henty 
This section is an excerpt from Electoral results for the Division of Henty § 1974

Higgins 
This section is an excerpt from Electoral results for the Division of Higgins § 1974

Holt 
This section is an excerpt from Electoral results for the Division of Holt § 1974

Hotham 
This section is an excerpt from Electoral results for the Division of Hotham § 1974

Indi 
This section is an excerpt from Electoral results for the Division of Indi § 1974

Isaacs 
This section is an excerpt from Electoral results for the Division of Isaacs § 1974

Kooyong 
This section is an excerpt from Electoral results for the Division of Kooyong § 1974

La Trobe 
This section is an excerpt from Electoral results for the Division of La Trobe § 1974

Lalor 
This section is an excerpt from Electoral results for the Division of Lalor § 1974

Mallee 
This section is an excerpt from Electoral results for the Division of Mallee § 1974

Maribyrnong 
This section is an excerpt from Electoral results for the Division of Maribyrnong § 1974

McMillan 
This section is an excerpt from Electoral results for the Division of McMillan § 1974

Melbourne 
This section is an excerpt from Electoral results for the Division of Melbourne § 1974

Melbourne Ports 
This section is an excerpt from Electoral results for the Division of Melbourne Ports § 1974

Murray 
This section is an excerpt from Electoral results for the Division of Murray § 1974

Scullin 
This section is an excerpt from Electoral results for the Division of Scullin § 1974

Wannon 
This section is an excerpt from Electoral results for the Division of Wannon § 1974

Wills 
This section is an excerpt from Electoral results for the Division of Wills § 1974

Wimmera 
This section is an excerpt from Electoral results for the Division of Wimmera § 1974

Queensland

Bowman 
This section is an excerpt from Electoral results for the Division of Bowman § 1974

Brisbane 
This section is an excerpt from Electoral results for the Division of Brisbane § 1974

Capricornia 
This section is an excerpt from Electoral results for the Division of Capricornia § 1974

Darling Downs 
This section is an excerpt from Electoral results for the Division of Darling Downs § 1974

Dawson 
This section is an excerpt from Electoral results for the Division of Dawson § 1974

Fisher 
This section is an excerpt from Electoral results for the Division of Fisher § 1974

Griffith 
This section is an excerpt from Electoral results for the Division of Griffith § 1974

Herbert 
This section is an excerpt from Electoral results for the Division of Herbert § 1974

Kennedy 
This section is an excerpt from Electoral results for the Division of Kennedy § 1974

Leichhardt 
This section is an excerpt from Electoral results for the Division of Leichhardt § 1974

Lilley 
This section is an excerpt from Electoral results for the Division of Lilley § 1974

Maranoa 
This section is an excerpt from Electoral results for the Division of Maranoa § 1974

McPherson 
This section is an excerpt from Electoral results for the Division of McPherson § 1974

Moreton 
This section is an excerpt from Electoral results for the Division of Moreton § 1974

Oxley 
This section is an excerpt from Electoral results for the Division of Oxley § 1974

Petrie 
This section is an excerpt from Electoral results for the Division of Petrie § 1974

Ryan 
This section is an excerpt from Electoral results for the Division of Ryan § 1974

Wide Bay 
This section is an excerpt from Electoral results for the Division of Wide Bay § 1974

South Australia

Adelaide 
This section is an excerpt from Electoral results for the Division of Adelaide § 1974

Angas 
This section is an excerpt from Electoral results for the Division of Angas (1949–1977) § 1949

Barker 
This section is an excerpt from Electoral results for the Division of Barker § 1974

Bonython 
This section is an excerpt from Electoral results for the Division of Bonython § 1974

Boothby 
This section is an excerpt from Electoral results for the Division of Boothby § 1974

Grey 
This section is an excerpt from Electoral results for the Division of Grey § 1974

Hawker 
This section is an excerpt from Electoral results for the Division of Hawker § 1974

Hindmarsh 
This section is an excerpt from Electoral results for the Division of Hindmarsh § 1974

Kingston 
This section is an excerpt from Electoral results for the Division of Kingston § 1974

Port Adelaide 
This section is an excerpt from Electoral results for the Division of Port Adelaide § 1974

Sturt 
This section is an excerpt from Electoral results for the Division of Sturt § 1974

Wakefield 
This section is an excerpt from Electoral results for the Division of Wakefield § 1974

Western Australia

Canning 
This section is an excerpt from Electoral results for the Division of Canning § 1974

Curtin 
This section is an excerpt from Electoral results for the Division of Curtin § 1974

Forrest 
This section is an excerpt from Electoral results for the Division of Forrest § 1974

Fremantle 
This section is an excerpt from Electoral results for the Division of Fremantle § 1974

Kalgoorlie 
This section is an excerpt from Electoral results for the Division of Kalgoorlie § 1974

Moore 
This section is an excerpt from Electoral results for the Division of Moore § 1974

Perth 
This section is an excerpt from Electoral results for the Division of Perth § 1974

Stirling 
This section is an excerpt from Electoral results for the Division of Stirling § 1974

Swan 
This section is an excerpt from Electoral results for the Division of Swan § 1974

Tangney 
This section is an excerpt from Electoral results for the Division of Tangney § 1974

Tasmania

Bass 
This section is an excerpt from Electoral results for the Division of Bass § 1974

Braddon 
This section is an excerpt from Electoral results for the Division of Braddon § 1974

Denison 
This section is an excerpt from Electoral results for the Division of Denison § 1974

Franklin 
This section is an excerpt from Electoral results for the Division of Franklin § 1974

Wilmot 
This section is an excerpt from Electoral results for the Division of Wilmot § 1974

Australian Capital Territory

Canberra 
This section is an excerpt from Electoral results for the Division of Canberra § 1974

Fraser 
This section is an excerpt from Electoral results for the Division of Fraser (Australian Capital Territory) § 1974

Northern Territory 

This section is an excerpt from Electoral results for the Division of Northern Territory § 1974

See also 
 Candidates of the 1974 Australian federal election
 Members of the Australian House of Representatives, 1974–1975

References 

House of Representatives 1974